Cesare Magarotto (1917-2006) was one of the founders of World Federation of the Deaf (WFD), its first General Secretary (1951–1987) and the son of Antonio Magarotto, the founder of the Italian National Agency for the Deaf (ENS).

References

Italian educators

Educators of the deaf
1917 births
2006 deaths